Rohan Bopanna and Matthew Ebden defeated Wesley Koolhof and Neal Skupski in the final, 6–3, 2–6, [10–8], to win the men's doubles tennis title at the 2023 Indian Wells Masters. At the age of 43, Bopanna overtook Daniel Nestor to become the oldest ATP Masters 1000 finalist and champion, winning his fifth Masters 1000 title and 24th career ATP Tour doubles title overall. It was Ebden's first Masters 1000 title and ninth career doubles title.

John Isner and Jack Sock were the defending champions, but lost in the semifinals to Bopanna and Ebden.

Koolhof, Skupski, and Rajeev Ram were in contention for the ATP no. 1 doubles ranking. Koolhof and Skupski retained the top ranking after Ram lost in the first round.

Seeds

Draw

Finals

Top half

Bottom half

Seeded teams
The following are the seeded teams, based on ATP rankings as of March 6, 2023.

Other entry information

Wildcards

Protected ranking

Alternates

Withdrawals
  Félix Auger-Aliassime /  Sebastian Korda → replaced by  Félix Auger-Aliassime /  Denis Shapovalov
  Roberto Bautista Agut /  Pablo Carreño Busta → replaced by  Francisco Cerúndolo /  Diego Schwartzman
  Ivan Dodig /  Austin Krajicek → replaced by  Austin Krajicek /  Mackenzie McDonald

References

External links
 Draw

BNP Paribas Open – Men's doubles
Doubles men